Crime + Punishment in Suburbia was a soundtrack for Crime and Punishment in Suburbia released in 2000. It contains 12 tracks of alternative music including the Pixies cover "Monkey Gone to Heaven" by Far.

Track listing 
Modest Mouse – "Trailer Trash" (Isaac Brock/Jeremiah Green/Eric Judy) – 5:47
Frank Black – "Bullet" (Frank Black) – 2:30
Far – "Monkey Gone to Heaven" (Black Francis) – 5:02
Magnapop – "This Family" (Linda Hopper/Ruthie Morris) – 3:28
Meat Puppets – "Two Rivers" (Curt Kirkwood) – 3:21
Joey Santiago – "Damaged Little Fuckers" (Joey Santiago)  – 2:03
Sleater-Kinney – "Burn, Don't Freeze" (Carrie Brownstein/Corin Tucker/Janet Weiss) – 3:15
OP8 – "Sand" (Lee Hazlewood) – 4:38
Toadies – "Mister Love" (Todd Lewis) – 2:51
Sound Furnace – "High School Cannibal Party" (Damian Wagner) – 1:50
Extra Fancy – "Sinnerman" (David Foster/Brian Grillo/Michael Hateley/Derek O'Brien) – 4:04
Guided by Voices – "Learning to Hunt" (Robert Pollard) – 2:26

References

Crime film soundtracks
2000 soundtrack albums
Milan Records albums
Drama film soundtracks